Ludvig Harald Knudsen (18 August 1843 – 16 March 1924) was a Historicist Danish architect. He mainly designed churches.

Biography
Ludvig Knudsen was born  in Copenhagen. 
He was the son of Jens Christian Knudsen (1801-1856) and Johanne F. Jakobsen (1811-1866). 

He apprenticed as a carpenter and was then admitted to the Royal Danish Academy of Fine Arts in 1860 where he studied under Gustav Friedrich Hetsch. After his graduation in 1869, he worked for both Christian Hansen and Ferdinand Meldahl. In 1871 he assumed a position as Building Inspector in Copenhagen  and remained in this position until 1889.

He designed a number of churches as well as various other sacral buildings, including   St. Stephen's Church (Sankt Stefans Kirke) in Copenhagen's Nørrebro district. He was also responsible for the restoration of the Reformed Church and the Garrison Church in Copenhagen.

He became  Knight of in the Order of the Dannebrog 1887 and titular professor 1900. 
Knudsen died in Copenhagen and was buried at Vestre Kirkegård.

Selected buildings
 St. Andrew's Church, Ordrup, Denmark (1871–72)
 St. Stephen's Church, Nørrebro, Copenhagen  (1873–74)
 Royal Orphanage, Copenhagen  (1879–80)
  Mission House Bethesda at  Israels Plads, Copenhagen (1881–82)
 St. Clement's Church, Bornholm, Denmark (1881–82)
 Shooting Range Wall, Royal Copenhagen Shooting Society, Copenhagen (1887)
  Church of Peace, Nørrebro, Copenhagen (1899)
  Rungsted Church, Rungsted, Denmark (1905–07)

Gallery

See also

 Architecture of Denmark

References

Historicist architects
Architects from Copenhagen
1843 births
1924 deaths
Royal Danish Academy of Fine Arts alumni
Knights of the Order of the Dannebrog